Gntuni was a medieval Armenian noble family. From  914 to 921, they ruled the town of Samshvilde as vassals of the Bagratid Kingdom of Armenia. 

Armenian noble families